Frédéric Lopez (born 4 April 1967 in Pau) is a French television host. He currently works for France 2 on which he presents some shows.

He began on radio in 1991 on Autoroute Info, the first traffic information radio. In 1992, he worked for Télé Lyon Métropole (TLM), the channel on which he debuted on television. There he hosted talk shows and documentaries. From 1995 to 1996, he hosted Le Mag de l'Information on LM1, with Guillaume Durand.

Then he worked on LCI, where he was special envoy and correspondent. On the same channel, he led the magazine Cinéma.

In 1999, he made several appearances in Olivier Schatzky's film Mr Naphatali, with Élie Kakou.

In 2000, he presented Alors heureux ? and Fallait y penser on France 2. Then in 2004, in addition to France 2 and his program Comme au cinéma, he joined Match TV where he led a news magazine. In 2005, he created the program Rendez-vous en terre inconnue.

From September 2008, he has hosted on France 2 Panique dans l'oreillette.

In 2017, Lopez publicly came out as gay.

References

1967 births
Living people
People from Pau, Pyrénées-Atlantiques
French radio presenters
French television presenters
French people of Spanish descent
French LGBT broadcasters
Officiers of the Ordre des Arts et des Lettres